The 2010 Primera División del Fútbol Profesional Chileno season (known as the 2010 Campeonato Nacional Petrobras for sponsorship reasons) was the 79th season of top-flight football in Chile. Originally comprising two tournaments, the 2010 season was the first single-stage season since 2001. This was due to the devastating 8.8 magnitude earthquake on February 27, 2010.
Universidad Católica won their tenth title.

Format changes
Due to Chile's qualification to the 2010 FIFA World Cup, the format for the season had seen a minor modification in the Apertura, which would not have the playoff stage. The Clausura remained unchanged. In the wake of the 8.8 magnitude earthquake that struck the country on February 27, the format was further changed to a double round-robin format by the ANFP, because many teams could not fulfill their Apertura fixtures in time as a result of the earthquake damage. After the Round 1 (the first 17 dates), the team with the most points qualified to the 2010 Copa Sudamericana and the 2011 Copa Libertadores. The next best-placed team played a playoff against Municipal Iquique for the last berth in the 2010 Copa Sudamericana. The season champion (the team with the most points after all 34 dates) also earned a berth to the 2011 Copa Libertadores. The Chile 3 berth for that competition have gone to the winner of a Liguilla of the 2nd, 3rd, 4th, and 5th best-placed teams at the end of the season.

Teams

Standings

Results

Relegation/promotion playoffs

Internationals qualification

Round 1 standings
The team that occupies first-place after the first 17 matches of the season automatically qualified for the group stage of the 2011 Copa Libertadores and the 2010 Copa Sudamericana. The second-placed team advanced to a playoff and face-off the 2009 Copa Chile runner-up Municipal Iquique for a spot in the 2010 Copa Sudamericana.

Pre-Copa Sudamericana Playoff
Universidad de Chile, The second best-placed team after Round 1, will play a two-legged tie against Municipal Iquique, the 2009 Copa Chile runner-up, for the Chile 3 berth in the 2010 Copa Sudamericana.

Pre-Copa Libertadores Liguilla
Universidad de Chile, Audax Italiano, Unión Española and Huachipato qualified for the Copa Libertadores Liguilla. The winner of the Liguilla will qualify to the 2011 Copa Libertadores as Chile 3.

The format for the Liguilla was a single elimination tournament, with two legs in each round. The team that finished 2nd in the final league standings played the team that finished 5th, and the team that finished 3rd played the team that finished 4th. The team that finished higher in the standings played the second leg at home. Ties were settled by points (3 for a win, 1 for a draw, 0 for a loss). If there was a tie in point at the end of regulation of the second leg, the team with the best goal difference advances/wins. If a tie remains, the away goals rule is applied, followed by two 15-minute extra-time, and a penalty shootout if necessary.

First round

Tie 1

Tie 2

Finals

Top goalscorers

Source:

References

External links
ANFP 
Season regulations 
2010 season on RSSSF

  
Primera División de Chile seasons
Chile
1